Giannitsochori is a village in the municipality of Zacharo, southern Elis, Greece. It is situated in the narrow coastal plains along the Ionian Sea, 2 km north of the mouth of the river Neda, at the foot of the western extensions of the mountain Minthi. It is a known beach resort.  It is 2 km north of Elaia, 5 km southeast of Neochori and 11 km southeast of Zacharo. The Greek National Road 9/E55 (Pyrgos - Kyparissia) and the railway from Pyrgos to Kalamata pass through the village.

Historical population

See also
List of settlements in Elis

References

Populated places in Elis